Scopula cornishi is a moth of the family Geometridae. It was described by Prout in 1932. It is found on Madagascar and the Comoros.

References

Moths described in 1932
Moths of the Comoros
Moths of Madagascar
cornishi
Taxa named by Louis Beethoven Prout